The Bigelow Monument is a public monument in Worcester, Massachusetts, United States. The monument, located in a small cemetery at the center of Worcester Common, honors Timothy Bigelow, a Patriot during the American Revolutionary War. The monument was dedicated on April 19, 1861, the 86th anniversary of the start of the war.

History

Background 
Timothy Bigelow was born in Worcester County, Massachusetts on August 12, 1739. As an adult, he worked as a blacksmith and owned a shop in Worcester. During the American Revolution, he was a Patriot, and He served as a colonel during the American Revolutionary War. He commanded the 15th Massachusetts Regiment and is notable for leading minutemen from Worcester during the Battles of Lexington and Concord, the first military engagement of the war. He was also involved in the Saratoga campaign and Valley Forge. Following the war, he commanded the Springfield Arsenal before dying on March 31, 1790 at the age of 51.

Erection 
On December 23, 1859, the city council of Worcester passed an act allowing Timothy Bigelow Lawrence (Bigelow's great grandson and son of Abbott Lawrence) to erect a monument to Timothy Bigelow on top of his burial place, located in Worcester Common. Worcester Mayor Alexander Bullock designated a  lot in the small cemetery in the commons for the monument. A committee was formed for the purposes of coordinating the monument's erection and dedication, and a group of prominent citizens organized to aid the committee, with former Massachusetts Governor Levi Lincoln Jr. as their chairman. In March 1861, the committee extended an invitation to Worcester native George Bancroft to give an oration at the monument's dedication, but he declined, citing his health. As part of the erection of the monument, Bigelow's body was exhumed and reinterred in a metallic casket. The monument itself was designed by George Snell, an architect from Boston. Two companies were involved in the construction of the monument, with the Granite Railway Company executing the granite portion of the monument and the marble, imported from Tuscany, was executed by Wentworth and Co. of Boston.

Dedication and later history 

The monument's dedication ceremony took place on April 19, 1861. On the Friday before the dedication (April 12) Mayor Isaac Davis and Governor Lincoln held a ceremony wherein multiple items were deposited within the monument, including multiple publications, a piece of wood from the Charter Oak, and a lock of hair belonging to Bigelow, among other items. The dedication ceremony, described in a 1914 book as one of the largest gatherings in the city, was attended by numerous descendants of Revolutionary War soldiers. The celebrations included a song, written by Clark Jillson, performed by a local glee club, followed by speeches given by several notable individuals. Among these included Lawrence, Mayor Davis, Governor Lincoln, Benjamin Thomas (grandson of Bigelow's contemporary Isaiah Thomas), and several members of the Bigelow family. While the dedication was taking place, members of the Massachusetts militia were involved in violent confrontations in the Baltimore riot of 1861, one of the first civil conflicts of the American Civil War. News of the violence would not reach Worcester until after the ceremony had concluded.

An 1889 history book on Worcester County lists the Bigelow Monument as one of only two memorials on Worcester Common, along with the Soldiers' Monument. Coincidentally, the Soldiers' Monument was accepted by Mayor Edward Livingston Davis, son of the mayor who had accepted the Bigelow Monument. In 1994, the monument was assessed as part of the Save Outdoor Sculpture! project. On Mother's Day in 2009, a military drill and wreath laying ceremony was held at the monument, with historian and author Ray Raphael presenting.

Design 
A time capsule is buried underneath the monument that contains documents regarding Bigelow and life in the colonial era. The architectural style of the monument, which is built primarily of Italian marble, is English Gothic. The monument's pedestal is four-sided, with carvings of ram's heads on each angle, with the following inscriptions on each face of the pedestal:

Above the pedestal, the four sides of the monument features carved canopies, atop which the monument becomes octagonal. According to a commemorative program published shortly after the dedication, the monument was topped with a foliated cross, with the total height of the structure being .

See also 
 1861 in art

References

Bibliography

External links 
 
 

1861 establishments in Massachusetts
1861 sculptures
American Revolutionary War monuments and memorials
Buildings and structures in Worcester, Massachusetts
Culture of Worcester, Massachusetts
Monuments and memorials in Massachusetts
Outdoor sculptures in Massachusetts
Landmarks in Worcester, Massachusetts